Dušan Bestvina (born 21 April 1981 in Trnava, Slovakia), is a Slovak football defender currently playing for FC Mistelbach. He can play as a right back or a centre back.

Career

Bestvina started his career at his hometown club FK Dukla Banská Bystrica, before moving to FC Spartak Trnava in 2001, where he spent four years. He then joined Austrian side FC Mistelbach in 2005.

Bestvina came to Scotland in the summer of 2007, and signed for Clyde on 14 September 2007, originally on an amateur contract. He made his debut the following day in a Scottish First Division match against Queen of the South.

He was rewarded for several good displays with a new 18-month professional contract in January 2008. He left Clyde in June 2008, after agreeing to have his contract terminated. He returned to former club FC Mistelbach after his release.

See also
Clyde F.C. season 2007-08

References

External links

Living people
1981 births
Clyde F.C. players
Expatriate footballers in Scotland
FC Spartak Trnava players
Scottish Football League players
Slovak expatriate sportspeople in Austria
Slovak expatriate sportspeople in Scotland
Slovak footballers
Sportspeople from Trnava
Association football defenders
Expatriate footballers in Austria